Ancylosis rhodochrella is a species of snout moth in the genus Ancylosis. It was described by Gottlieb August Wilhelm Herrich-Schäffer in 1852, and is known from Russia, Spain, Portugal and Cyprus.

References

External links
Lepiforum e.V.

Moths described in 1852
rhodochrella
Moths of Europe